A lixiviant is a chemical used in hydrometallurgy to extract particular elements from its ore.  One of the most famous lixiviants is cyanide, which is used in extracting 90% of mined gold.  The combination of cyanide and air converts gold particles into a soluble salt.  Once separated from the bulk gangue, the solution is processed in a series of steps to give the metal.

Etymology
The origin is the word 'lixiviate', meaning to leach or to dissolve out, deriving from the Latin lixivium. A lixiviant assists in rapid and complete leaching, for example during in situ leaching. The metal can be recovered from it in a concentrated form after leaching.

Further reading

References

Metallurgical processes